Al filo de la muerte (English: At the edge of death) is a Mexican telenovela produced by Emilio Larrosa for Televisa in 1991.

Humberto Zurita and Gabriela Rivero starred as protagonists, while Antonio Escobar and Blanca Guerra starred as antagonists.

Plot
Tracy López is a young nurse who lives in Los Angeles with her boyfriend, Sam Ross. Her relationship is relatively quiet, until Tracy accidentally witnesses a murder committed by her boyfriend. Scared, she goes to the Police Department telling what she saw. She subsequently finds out that Sam has been lying to her the whole time as he actually has criminal connections to the mob. The police introduce Tracy to the Witness Protection Program, where she is given a new identity: from then on her name will be Mariela Foret. Following the directions they give her, she flees the country to Mexico City. There she is employed in a prestigious hospital belonging to the respected cardiologist Francisco Riquer, who as a person is hard and full of remorse, because he could not save his wife and son, who died in the 1985 Mexico earthquake. But as a doctor, on the other hand, he is noble and compassionate.

Francisco and Tracy will meet and despite the initial disagreements they have, they will end up falling in love, but Sam, furious at having been betrayed by his girlfriend, will travel to Mexico not willing to let her be happy with the doctor.

Cast 

 Humberto Zurita as Dr. Francisco Riquer
 Gabriela Rivero as Tracy López/Mariela Foret
 Antonio Escobar as Sam Ross
 Blanca Guerra as Alina Estrada
 Manuel Ojeda as Julio Araujo
 Adriana Roel as Laura Robles
 Carlos Cámara as Luigi Valenti
 Alonso Echánove as Father Juan
 Luz María Jerez as Iris Salgado
 Ana Patricia Rojo as Mónica Álvarez
 José Ángel García as Dr. Arturo Lozano
 Stephanie Salas as Pilar Orozco
 Raquel Pankowsky as Adela
 Germán Bernal as Ricardo Araujo
 Egardo Gazcón as Dr. Raúl Soto
 Alejandra Morales as Patricia
 Miguel Priego as Jorge Palacios
 Antonio Miguel as Erasmo
 Guillermo Aguilar as Manuel Palacios
 Raúl Araiza as Marcial Duboa
 Luisa Huertas as Liliana
 Mauricio Ferrari as Humberto Álvarez
 Antonio Ruiz as Rodrigo
 Beatriz Martínez as Eugenia
 Josefina Escobedo as Emilia
 Rebeca Manríquez as Mrs. Gálvez
 Anabel Villegas as Rita
 Alberto Inzúa as Alfredo
 Miguel Suárez as Father José Antonio
 Marcial Salinas as Sabino
 Melba Luna as Doña Paz
 Toño Infante as King
 Sergio Sendel
 Julio Monterde as Marcelino
 Maricarmen Vela as Karla
 Fernando Gálvez as Salvador
 José Luis Duval as Guillén
 Carmen Amezcua as Lindsay
 Alfredo Gurrola as Tony
 Antonio Rangel as Rodman
 Ángeles Marín as Luz
 Rosa Elena Díaz as Elvira
 Gerardo Paz as Forman
 Mario del Río
 José Roberto Hill as Salgado
 Alfonso Ramírez
 Romina Castro
 Roberto Sen as Carlos
 Alicia Campos as Violeta
 Concepción Martínez
 Kokin as Matías
 Enrique Muñoz as Rufo
 Homero Wilmer as Pierre
 Eduardo Arizpe as Frank
 Laura Beyer as Alma
 Sara Guasch as Carolina
 Benjamín Islas as Rambo
 Jaime Lozano as "El Bronco"
 Guy de Saint Cyr as Captain Walters
 Oscar Vallejo as Quique
 Ana Graham as Greta
 Rosita Bouchot as Prieta
 Raúl Alberto as Adrián
 Edith Kleiman as Martina
 Lourdes Canale as Roberta
 Tere Salinas as Doris
 Angélica Ynrrigarro as Susana
 Francisco Casasola as David
 Dobrina Cristeva as Christa
 Claudia Vega as Silvia
 Marcela Arguimbau as Lourdes

Awards

References

External links

1991 telenovelas
Mexican telenovelas
1991 Mexican television series debuts
1992 Mexican television series endings
Spanish-language telenovelas
Television shows set in Mexico
Televisa telenovelas